Supercheap Auto is an Australian automotive parts and accessories retailer. It was founded in 1972, operating as a mail-order business and opened its first store in Brisbane in 1974. It now has 300 stores across Australia and New Zealand.

History 
Supercheap Auto was founded by Reg and Hazel Rowe in 1972 as a mail-order business. The couple sold imported battery chargers and other automotive accessories from their home. In 1974, they opened their first store in Fortitude Valley.

The company has over 300 stores throughout Australia and also in New Zealand, the 250th being Timaru in New Zealand and the 300th being Holden Hill in South Australia.

Store formats 
Supercheap Auto has some newer formats stores including 1,000sqm Superstores at Oxenford, Alice Springs, Cannon Hill and Caboolture and smaller 400sqm stores as well as more common 700 sq m formats.

Sponsorships

From 2005 to 2020, Supercheap Auto held sponsorship naming rights for the Bathurst 1000. It has also sponsored several Supercars Championship teams since 1997 under the brand Supercheap Auto Racing, including Steven Ellery Racing (2000-2004), Paul Weel Racing (2005-2007), Paul Morris Motorsport (2008-2011), Walkinsaw Racing (2012-2015) and Tickford Racing (2016-2020).

It was naming rights sponsor of the Bathurst 1000 from 2005 until 2020, and became the naming rights sponsor of the TCR Australia Touring Car Series in 2021.

After the Supercars title and Bathurst race sponsorship went to Repco in 2021, Supercheap became an associate sponsor of Triple Eight Race Engineering as well as naming rights sponsor for entries in the 2021 and 2022 Bathurst 1000.

References

External links

Automotive companies of Australia
Automotive part retailers
Automotive part retailers of New Zealand
Companies based in Brisbane
Retail companies established in 1972
Super Retail Group
1972 establishments in Australia